NGC 903 is a lenticular galaxy in the constellation Aries. It is estimated to be about 230 million light-years from the Milky Way and has a diameter of approximately 35,000 ly. NGC 903 was discovered on 13 December 1884 by the astronomer Edouard Stephan.

See also 
 List of NGC objects (1–1000)

References

External links 
 

Lenticular galaxies
0903
Aries (constellation)
009097